Naomi Carroll (born 13 September 1992) is an Irish Olympian and Ireland women's field hockey international. In 2015–16 Carroll won a Women's Irish Hockey League title with Hermes. Carroll has also played both camogie and ladies' Gaelic football at senior inter-county level for Clare and represented the Republic of Ireland women's national under-17 football team.

Early years and education
Carroll is originally from Cratloe, County Clare. She completed her secondary level education at St Patrick's Comprehensive in Shannon.  Between 2011 and 2015 she attended Mary Immaculate College where she gained a BA in Maths and Irish. Between 2015 and 2017 she attended NUI Galway where she completed a Masters of Education in Maths and Irish. Since 2016 Carroll has worked as a Maths, Coding and Irish teacher at Gaelcoláiste Luimnigh.

Association football
In addition to playing gaelic games and field hockey, in her youth Carroll also represented the Republic of Ireland women's national football team at schoolgirl level. Her teammates included Deirdre Duke and Dora Gorman. Carroll also played for Mary Immaculate College at intervarsity level.

Gaelic games

Clubs
Carroll initially played hurling with boys teams at Cratloe as the club did not have a camogie team. She subsequently played camogie with Na Piarsaigh and Sixmilebridge. She also played club ladies' Gaelic football with Banner Ladies, helping them win the 2013 Munster Ladies Senior Club Football Championship.

Intervarsity
Carroll played both camogie and ladies' Gaelic football at intervarsity level for Mary Immaculate College. She scored 2–1 as MIC ladies footballers defeated NUI Maynooth in the 2012 Giles Cup final. She also helped the MIC camogie team win both the 2012 Fr Meachair Cup and a league title. In 2015 she helped the MIC camogie team win the Purcell Cup

Inter-county
Carroll played camogie at minor inter-county level for both Limerick and Clare. In 2009 she was a member of the Limerick team that won the All-Ireland Minor B Camogie Championship. She scored 3–5 in the final against Waterford, including two injury-time goals, as Limerick won the game by a point. She then played for Clare in the 2010 All-Ireland Minor Camogie Championship final. In 2012 Carroll was a member of the Clare team that won the Munster Senior Camogie Championship. She was named player of the match as Clare defeated Cork by 0–9 to 0–7. Carroll has also played senior ladies' Gaelic football for Clare.

Field hockey

Catholic Institute
Carroll played for Catholic Institute while still a student at St Patrick's Comprehensive. She was a Catholic Institute player when she made her senior debut for Ireland. Carroll helped Catholic Institute win Munster league and championship titles.

Hermes
In 2015–16, Carroll was a member of the Hermes team that won the Women's Irish Hockey League title and the EY Champions Trophy. Other members of the team included Anna O'Flanagan, Chloe Watkins and Nicola Evans. While playing for Hermes, Carroll also worked at Coláiste Íosagáin as a student teacher.

Cork Harlequins
In the 2016–17 season Carroll was a member of the Cork Harlequins team that played in the Irish Senior Cup final. Other members of the team included Roisin Upton and Yvonne O'Byrne. In 2017–18 she helped Harlequins finish as runners up in both the Women's Irish Hockey League and the EY Champions Trophy.

Ireland international
Carroll made her senior debut for Ireland on 24 August 2012 in a 4–0 win over Wales. On 26 August 2012 in her second international, also against Wales, she scored two goals in a 3–1 win. On 17 March 2015 during a 2014–15 Women's FIH Hockey World League Round 2 match against Turkey, Carroll scored four goals in a 13–0 win. She subsequently helped Ireland win the tournament, defeating Canada in the final after a penalty shoot-out. In July 2015 Carroll scored five goals, including one in the final against the Czech Republic, as she helped Ireland win the 2015 Women's EuroHockey Championship II. In January 2017 she was also a member of the Ireland team that won a 2016–17 Women's FIH Hockey World League Round 2 tournament in Kuala Lumpur, defeating Malaysia 3–0 in the final. In February 2018 Carroll made her 100th senior appearance for Ireland against Spain. She was selected as a non-travelling reserve for the 2018 Women's Hockey World Cup.

Honours

Field hockey
Ireland
Women's FIH Hockey World League
Winners: 2015 Dublin, 2017 Kuala Lumpur
Women's EuroHockey Championship II
Winners: 2015
Women's Hockey Champions Challenge I
Runners Up: 2014
Cork Harlequins
Women's Irish Hockey League
Runners Up: 2017–18
Irish Senior Cup
Runners Up: 2016–17
EY Champions Trophy
Runners Up: 2018
Hermes
Women's Irish Hockey League
Winners: 2015–16
EY Champions Trophy
Winners: 2015-16

Camogie
Clare
Munster Senior Camogie Championship
Winners: 2012 
All-Ireland Minor Camogie Championship
Runners Up: 2010
Limerick
All-Ireland Minor B Camogie Championship
Winners: 2009

Gaelic football
Banner Ladies
Munster Ladies Senior Club Football Championship
Winners: 2013
Runners Up: 2012

References

External links
 Naomi Carroll at Hockey Ireland
 
 
 
 

1992 births
Living people
Alumni of Mary Immaculate College, Limerick
Alumni of the University of Galway
Women's association footballers not categorized by position
Clare ladies' Gaelic footballers
Clare camogie players
Dual camogie–football players
Female field hockey forwards
Ireland international women's field hockey players
Irish female field hockey players
Irish schoolteachers
Language teachers
Limerick camogie players
Mathematics educators
Republic of Ireland women's association footballers
Sportspeople from County Clare
Women's Irish Hockey League players
Ladies' Gaelic footballers who switched code
Field hockey players at the 2020 Summer Olympics
Olympic field hockey players of Ireland
Republic of Ireland women's youth international footballers